Live at the Whiskey a Go-Go is a live album by The Stooges, produced by Ron Asheton and released in 1988. It is the recording of the Stooges show on 16 September 1973 at the Whisky a Go Go nightclub, Los Angeles, California.

Track listing
All songs written by Iggy Pop and James Williamson except as noted.

 "Raw Power" – 5:12
 "Head On" – 8:01
 "Search and Destroy" – 4:49
 "I Need Somebody" – 5:59
 "New Orleans" – 5:53
 "She Creatures of Hollywood Hills" – 9:53 
 "Open Up and Bleed" – 12:55
 "Gimme Danger" – 6:49

Personnel
The Stooges
 Iggy Pop – vocals
 James Williamson – guitars
 Ron Asheton – bass, vocals
 Scott Asheton – drums
 Scott Thurston – piano, mouth harp

References 

The Stooges albums
1988 live albums
Albums recorded at the Whisky a Go Go